The following is the list of Kategoria Superiore top scorers by season, since the inception of the Albanian National Championship in 1930 until the present day. Refik Resmja holds the record for most goals in a single season at 59, and he also holds the record for most awards won, with seven. The latest top scorer of the Kategoria Superiore is Dejvi Bregu of Teuta.

Winners

Awards by players

Awards won by nationality

Awards won by club

See also
Capocannoniere
Premier League Golden Boot
List of Bundesliga top scorers
List of Süper Lig top scorers
European Golden Shoe
List of top international association football goal scorers by country

References

   
Albania
Association football player non-biographical articles